Dar Kul (also Romanized as Dar Kūl; also known as Darreh Kūl) is a village in Pishkuh-e Zalaqi Rural District, Besharat District, Aligudarz County, Lorestan Province, Iran. At the 2006 census, its population was 67, in 14 families.

References 

Towns and villages in Aligudarz County